The Parmley Land Office, on Main St. in Ipswich, South Dakota, was built in 1900.  It has also been known as the Fireplace Bar.  It was listed on the National Register of Historic Places in 1979.

Numerous land transactions were executed at the office during a land boom from 1900 to 1910 during which land was often sold at price of ten dollars per acre;  dry years of 1910 and 1911 cut down the activity.

References

Commercial buildings on the National Register of Historic Places in South Dakota
Commercial buildings completed in 1900
Edmunds County, South Dakota